Gregory Peck Hyder (June 21, 1948 – October 1, 2014) was a former professional basketball player who played one season for the Kansas City Kings of the National Basketball Association (NBA).

Early life
Gregory Peck Hyder was born on June 21, 1948, in San Bernardino, California, the son of Charles and Myrna Hyder. The family moved to Victorville, California, where Greg and his brothers grew up and attended Victor Valley High School. In high school, Greg was a three-sport star, but excelled in basketball under future SCIBCA Hall of Fame coach, Ollie Butler.  Greg was a Second Team All-Southern California "AA" Basketball selection in 1966 earning him a scholarship to Eastern New Mexico University.

College career
After graduating from high school, Greg attended Eastern New Mexico University from 1966 to 1970. His brother, Jerry Hyder, followed and attended Eastern New Mexico University from 1967 to 1971. Together, in 1969, they led the Greyhounds to a 23–7 record and the school's only NAIA Basketball Championships. The following year, during the 1970 NAIA Tournament, Greg was the leading rebounder throughout the tournament with 65 rebounds through 5 games and was named the Chuck Taylor Most Valuable Player, despite his team finishing third.  He was a four-time NAIA All American and earned first team selection for the 1970 season. When he graduation in 1970, he had set numerous school basketball records, including being the school's all-time leading scorer and rebounder.

Most career points: 2,278 (1966–1970)
Most points in a season: 711 (31 games) (1969–1970)
Most field goals made in a season: 305 (1969–1970)
Most field goals made in a career: 935 (1966–1970)
Most field goals attempted in a season: 554 (1968–1969)
Most field goals attempted in a career: 1765 (1966–1970)
Most rebounds in a game: 30 vs. Fort Lewis on March 5, 1968
Most rebounds in a season: 404 (1968–1969)
Most rebounds in a career: 1,445
Career rebounding average: 12.4 rebounds per game

Greg was inducted into the Eastern New Mexico University Athletic Hall of Fame in 1984.

His brother, Jerry Hyder, finished his college career at Eastern New Mexico University as the 7th leading scorer in school's history with 1,316 points and currently stands 10th all time. He was inducted into the Eastern New Mexico University Athletic Hall of Fame in 1999.

NBA career
Greg was drafted in the third round of the 1970 NBA draft by the Cincinnati Royals (39th overall pick) and played one season in the NBA. His two career high games came against two of the most dominant big men in the era. Against the Milwaukee Bucks and Kareem Abdul-Jabbar on January 15, 1971, Greg scored a career high 17 points against the eventual NBA champions. On February 15, 1971, against the Wilt Chamberlain led Los Angeles Lakers, Greg scored 16 points in front of a large crowd that traveled via bus from Victorville, California, to watch the former high school star. Greg has the distinction of being the first NBA player from San Bernardino County.

His brother, Jerry, was drafted by the Denver Rockets of the ABA in 1971, but never played professional basketball.

Career stats

College

NBA

Regular season

|-
| align="left" | 1970–71
| align="left" | Cincinnati
| 77 || – || 17.6 || .447 ||  || .718 || 4.3 || .6 ||  ||  || 5.4
|}

References

1948 births
2014 deaths
American men's basketball players
Basketball players from California
Cincinnati Royals draft picks
Cincinnati Royals players
Eastern New Mexico Greyhounds men's basketball players
People from Victorville, California
Power forwards (basketball)